This is a list of the National Register of Historic Places listings in Jasper County, Texas.

This is intended to be a complete list of properties listed on the National Register of Historic Places in Jasper County, Texas. There are seven properties listed on the National Register in the county. Two properties are State Antiquities Landmarks one of which along with three others are Recorded Texas Historic Landmarks.

Current listings

The locations of National Register properties may be seen in a mapping service provided.

|}

See also

National Register of Historic Places listings in Texas
Recorded Texas Historic Landmarks in Jasper County

References

External links

Jasper County, Texas
Jasper County
Buildings and structures in Jasper County, Texas